Humo's Rock Rally is a Belgian contest for rock bands, organized every second year since 1978. It is organized by the Belgian magazine HUMO.

Every band that has not yet released an official recording, may enter the Rock Rally, by submitting a demo to HUMO. Humo then selects 100 bands to compete in the pre-selections, followed by semi-finals and a final with 10 bands. The competing bands are assessed by a professional jury. Money prizes are awarded to the top three bands, as well as to one band chosen by the audience.

The Rock Rally is an important possibility for young Belgian rock bands to get in the picture. Many notable Belgian bands and musicians, such as dEUS, The Black Box Revelation, Evil Superstars, Novastar, Milow, Arid, An Pierlé, Das Pop, Admiral Freebee and Goose, launched their career in the Rock Rally.

Past prize winners and notable finalists

2020
 Meskerem Mees
 Wolker
 Dyce
Other finalists: Yokan (Audience choice), All-Turn, Hugs of the Sky, Jakomo, Uma Chine, Be Irving, Terms

2018
 The Calicos
 Lagüna
 EMY
Other finalists: Danny Blue and the Old Socks, Ugly Weirdo

2016
 Whispering Sons
 Rewind Productions
 dirk.
Other finalists: Delta Crash, Equal Idiots

2014
 Warhola
 Nordmann
 Five Days
Other finalists: Byron Bay

2012
 Compact Disk Dummies
 Sleepers' Reign (Audience choice)
 Float Fall

Other finalists : Tourist LeMC

2010
 School is Cool
 The Sore Losers
 Willow (Audience choice)
Other finalists: Amatorski, Maya's Moving Castle, The Crackups, Psycho 44, The Mojo Filters, Gloria, Nele Van Den Broeck

2008
Steak Number Eight
 Jasper Erkens (audience choice)
 Team William
Other finalists: Berriegordies, Roadburg, The Galacticos, The Hong Kong Dong, The Porn Bloopers, The Tabasco Collective, Way

2006
 The Hickey Underworld
 The Black Box Revelation
 Rye Jehu
 Balthazar (audience choice)
Other finalist: Freaky Age

2004
 The Van Jets
 Absynthe Minded
 Madensuyu (audience choice)
Milow

2002
 Goose
 Illyrian (audience choice)
 Very Camel

2000
 Mintzkov Luna
 Admiral Freebee (audience choice)
 Venus In Flames
 Mint
 Zornik Breknov (now Zornik)

1998
 Das Pop
 Fence
 Chrome Yellow

1996
 Novastar
 Tom Helsen
 Sheffield Wednesday
 Arid
 An Pierlé

1994
 Evil Superstars
 Sticks & Stones
 Sweater

1992
 Charlie 45
 The Beautiful Babies
 Orgasmaddix
 dEUS

1990
 Noordkaap
 Kitchen of Insanity
 Gorky

1988
 Ze Noiz
 The Romans
 The B-Tunes
 Citizen Kane (with Daan Stuyven)

1986
 The Peter Pan Band
 Passion of a Primitif
 The Wolfbanes / The Boy Wonders (shared third place)

1984
 Elisa Waut
 Morceaux Durs
 Beau Geste
Other finalists: Yasja, Gabriella & the Professionals, Chow-chow, Rue Da Mort, Mensen Blaffen, Primitifs, The Beauty Trap

1982
 The Chrome
 2 Belgen
 5 CV
Gruppenbild (with Stijn Meuris)

1980
 The Machines
 The Singles
 The Sweeties

1978
 Once More
 Stagebeast
 Clown
 De Kreuners
 Speedy King and his Feetwarmers met Guido Belcanto

References

External links
 HUMO
 Unofficial Rock Rally Website
 Spotify-playlist Humo's Rock Rally

Music competitions